is a song recorded by Japanese singer Shizuka Kudo, from her sixteenth studio album, Tsukikage. It was released by Pony Canyon as the album's second single on April 27, 2005. The song was featured as the theme song on the first installment of the Pretty Cure anime film series, Futari wa Pretty Cure Max Heart the Movie (2005), for which she also voiced the character of the Queen of the Garden of Hope. A separate edition of the single including an alternate version of the song, as well as another song from the movie performed by Mayumi Gojo, was released by Marvelous Entertainment on May 25, 2005.

The coupling song, "Urunda Heart" served as theme song to the CX variety show, F2 Smile.

Background and composition
"Kokoro no Chikara" was released two months following “Lotus (Umareshi Hana)”, Kudo's comeback single to Pony Canyon. It is a personal favorite of Kudo's; she regards the song as a blessing and lists the song's recording as a key moment in her rediscovery of her love for music. The song, described as an uplifting strings-heavy R&B-influenced midtempo track, was written by Takahiro Maeda and composed, arranged and produced by H-Wonder. It was composed in the key of F major and Kudo's vocals span from G3 to C5. Lyrically, the song is about finding happiness from within. Kudo's vocal performance was praised for being powerful and effortless.

Chart performance
"Kokoro no Chikara" debuted at number 60 on the Oricon Singles Chart, selling 3,000 copies in its first week, and charted for two weeks.

Track listing

Charts

Release history

References

2005 songs
2005 singles
Anime songs
Pretty Cure songs
Songs written for animated films
Shizuka Kudo songs
Pony Canyon singles
Songs with music by H-Wonder